Petri Vuorinen (born 31 August 1972) is a Finnish football manager. He is the sporting director with Honka.

References

1972 births
Living people
Finnish footballers
Finnish football managers
Vaasan Palloseura managers
Association footballers not categorized by position